Shanxu (Zhuang: Sanhih Cin) is a town under the administration of Fusui County in southern Guangxi Zhuang Autonomous Region, China. , it had an area of  populated by 38,000 people residing in 1 residential communities and 11 villages.

Administrative divisions
There are 1 residential communities and 11 villages:

Residential communities:
 Shanxu(山圩社区)

Villages:
 Qutou(渠透村),  Nali(那利村), Bayin(坝引村), Kunlun(昆仑村), Pingtian(平天村), Napai(那派村), Pinggao(平搞村), Na bai(那白村), Yubai(玉柏村), Jiuta(九塔村), Naren(那任村)

See also
List of township-level divisions of Guangxi

References

External links
  Shanxu Town/Official website of  Shanxu

Towns of Guangxi
Fusui County